Angel Street is an American crime drama television series created by John Wells, that aired on CBS from September 15 to October 3, 1992.

Premise
Two female detectives, a veteran and an ambitious rookie, team up on the streets of Chicago.

Cast
Robin Givens as Detective Anita King
Pamela Gidley as Detective Dorothy Paretsky
Ron Dean as Detective Branigan
Joe Guzaldo as Sgt. Ciamacco
Rick Snyder as Detective Kanaskie
Luray Cooper as Detective Llewellyn
Danny Goldring as Detective Delaney

Episodes

References

External links

1992 American television series debuts
1992 American television series endings
1990s American crime drama television series
English-language television shows
CBS original programming
Television shows set in Chicago
Television series by Warner Bros. Television Studios
Fictional portrayals of the Chicago Police Department